The Last Duel is a 2021 historical action drama film directed by Ridley Scott from a screenplay by Nicole Holofcener, Ben Affleck, and Matt Damon, based on the 2004 book The Last Duel: A True Story of Crime, Scandal, and Trial by Combat in Medieval France by Eric Jager. Set in medieval France, the film stars Damon as Jean de Carrouges, a knight who challenges his former friend, squire Jacques Le Gris (Adam Driver) to a judicial duel after Jean's wife, Marguerite (Jodie Comer), accuses Jacques of raping her. The events leading up to the duel are divided into three distinct chapters, reflecting the contradictory perspectives of the three main characters. Affleck also stars in a supporting role as Count Pierre d'Alençon.

An adaptation of Jager's book was first announced in 2015, though it was not officially greenlit until July 2019. Affleck and Damon were confirmed as stars and co-writers that month, with Comer and Driver joining the cast later that year. Filming took place in France and Ireland from February to October 2020, with a hiatus of several months due to the COVID-19 pandemic.

The Last Duel premiered at the 78th Venice International Film Festival on September 10, 2021, and was theatrically released in the United States on October 15, 2021, by Walt Disney Studios Motion Pictures. The film received positive reviews from critics, who praised the performances of the cast and production values, and likened it to the Akira Kurosawa film Rashomon (1950). It was selected by the National Board of Review as one of the top ten films of 2021. Although the film had performed poorly at the worldwide box office, it later found financial success at the VOD and other post-theatrical markets.

Plot
While the plot of The Last Duel is portrayed in three separate chapters, each telling the same story from the perspective of the three main characters, the following description summarizes all three presentations into a single thread.

After serving in the Caroline War, French squires Jean de Carrouges and Jacques Le Gris swear allegiance to Count Pierre d'Alençon, who has been named Jean's overlord by King Charles VI. Jacques later tells Jean that Pierre has tasked him with collecting war levies, agreeing to ask for leniency on Jean's behalf when his brother-in-arms explains he lacks the funds.

To restore his finances, Jean marries Marguerite de Thibouville on the promise of a large dowry from Marguerite's father, Robert, that grants the rights to many valuable estates. Pierre, however, seizes the prized estate of Aunou-le-Faucon to settle Robert's back taxes and gifts it to Jacques, who has earned a court position by using his accounting knowledge to organize Pierre's finances. Jean takes the matter before King Charles, who dismisses the suit. Pierre retaliates by appointing Jacques to the captaincy of a Carrouges family post following the death of Jean's father.

Jean's marriage becomes strained due to the couple's failure to conceive. He and Jacques reconcile at a celebration, where Jacques becomes smitten with Marguerite after she befriends him in an attempt to win favor. Jacques misinterprets this as a reciprocation of his affections and suspects she does not love Jean.

Following a defeated military campaign in Scotland that sees him knighted for his efforts but still bankrupt, Jean sets off for Paris to collect his wages, leaving Marguerite to manage the estate in his absence. One day, Jean's mother takes all the servants to attend to legal business, leaving Marguerite alone. Jacques later visits and tricks his way into the chateau, haughtily proclaiming his love. When he ignores Marguerite's orders to leave, she attempts to flee from his advances, only for him to chase her to her room, and despite her protests, he rapes her before ordering her not to tell her husband.

Upon Jean's return, Marguerite tells him what happened; after questioning whether she is telling the truth, Jean becomes convinced that Jacques raped Marguerite to insult him specifically. Jean insists that Marguerite immediately have sex with him so that Jacques will not be "the last man that knew her."

Pierre informs Jacques that Jean is accusing him of raping Marguerite, which he denies. Despite the count's attempt to exert his authority, Jean appeals his case directly to King Charles and requests a duel to the death. Jacques accepts, having decided not to seek a favorable forum of a Catholic ecclesiastical court with clerical judges. Marguerite's friends abandon her, believing her to be lying to cover up an affair, while Jean's mother insists Marguerite drop her accusations and accept any consequences.

At Jacques' trial six months later, a now-pregnant Marguerite remains resolute that she is telling the truth, while the court implies that Jacques is the father of her child. Charles grants Jean's request for a duel to the death to determine the case. Marguerite is also informed that she will be burned alive for perjury if her husband loses. Marguerite confronts Jean for not telling her she would be burned alive if he fails. Marguerite gives birth to her son not long before the duel takes place.

The duel begins with Jean and Jacques jousting until both men lose their mounts and fight hand-to-hand. Following a lengthy struggle, Jean is stabbed in the groin but eventually manages to pin down Jacques. He demands that Jacques confess or face damnation, but Jacques claims his innocence. Jean then kills him. Jean basks in the glory of his victory while Marguerite follows quietly behind. Meanwhile, Jacques' body is stripped, and hung upside down publicly.

A textual epilogue reveals Jean died fighting in the Crusades while Marguerite continued managing his estate, living in peace for the remainder of her life but never remarrying.

Cast

 Matt Damon as Sir Jean de Carrouges
 Adam Driver as Jacques Le Gris
 Jodie Comer as Marguerite de Carrouges
 Ben Affleck as Count Pierre d'Alençon
 Harriet Walter as Nicole de Buchard
 Alex Lawther as King Charles VI
 Serena Kennedy as Queen Isabeau
 Marton Csokas as Crespin
 Željko Ivanek as Le Coq
 Tallulah Haddon as Marie
 Bryony Hannah as Alice
 Nathaniel Parker as Sir Robert de Thibouville
 Sam Hazeldine as Thomin du Bois
 Michael McElhatton as Bernard Latour
 Oliver Cotton as Jean de Carrouges III
 Clive Russell as King's Uncle
 Adam Nagaitis as Adam Louvel
 Bosco Hogan as Priest
 Clare Dunne as Ceila
 Caoimhe O'Malley as Elizabeth

Production

Development
The project was initially announced in July 2015, with Francis Lawrence planning to direct the film, and Shaun Grant writing the screenplay. No further development was announced, and the film rights lapsed. In July 2019, Deadline Hollywood announced that Ridley Scott was planning to direct the film, with Ben Affleck and Matt Damon set to star as well as write the screenplay with Nicole Holofcener. With Walt Disney Studios holding the rights to the film as a result of the Disney–Fox merger, it was unknown if the company would produce the film owing to its subject matter; however, Deadline Hollywood added that "every studio in town was waiting in the wings" should Disney sell the rights. In September, Jodie Comer entered negotiations to join the cast and was confirmed the following month, with Adam Driver entering negotiations to join the film after Affleck opted to play a different supporting role. Driver was confirmed in November, with Disney stating it would distribute the film by setting a release date. Harriet Walter was added to the cast in February 2020. Dr. Lorris Chevalier at the time a Phd student and curator in Berze castle joined the project as the historical advisor.

Filming 
Filming began on February 14, 2020, in Dordogne, France and continued until March 12, 2020, in the medieval castle of Berzé-le-Châtel (near Mâcon), Burgundy, France (with a film crew of 300 people including 100 extras). Filming was to have taken place in  Ireland, using locations at Bective Abbey, County Meath and Cahir Castle, County Tipperary and various locations across Dublin and County Wicklow from March 23, 2020, to March 30, 2020. On March 13, 2020, Disney announced that the studio had to delay the shoot indefinitely amid concerns for the cast and crew in light of the COVID-19 pandemic as well as travel restrictions in Europe. Filming resumed in late September 2020 and production concluded in Ireland on October 14, 2020.

Release
The Last Duel was originally scheduled to begin a limited theatrical release on December 25, 2020, before going wide on January 8, 2021. As a result of the COVID-19 pandemic, the release date was delayed to October 15, 2021. It had its world premiere at the 78th Venice International Film Festival on September 10, 2021. The film played exclusively in theaters for 45 days before it headed to digital platforms.

Home media
The film was released on digital platforms and premium video-on-demand on November 30, 2021, and on Blu-ray, DVD and Ultra HD Blu-ray on December 14, 2021, by Walt Disney Studios Home Entertainment.

The Last Duel became available for streaming on HBO Max on January 14, 2022. According to the streaming aggregator JustWatch, The Last Duel was the 2nd most watched film across all platforms in the United States, during the week ending January 16, 2022.

Reception

Box office 
The Last Duel grossed $10.9 million in the United States and Canada and $19.7 million in other territories, for a worldwide total of $30.6million.

In the United States and Canada, The Last Duel was initially projected to gross around $10 million from 3,065 theaters in its opening weekend. After making $1.8 million on its first day, including $350,000 from Thursday night previews, estimates were lowered to $5 million. It ended up debuting to $4.8 million, finishing fifth at the box office and marking the worst opening of Scott's career. Deadline Hollywood attributed the underperformance to the two-and-a-half-hour runtime limiting the number of showings, the subject matter being hard to market, the 45+ age demo not fully returning to theaters yet, and competition from Halloween Kills and No Time to Die. Several publications labeled the film a box-office bomb, and noted that 20th Century would likely lose millions on it. It fell 55% in its second weekend to $2.1 million, falling to seventh. The third weekend saw a drop of 78% to $558,000, for a domestic gross of around $10 million.

During an interview on the podcast WTF with Marc Maron in November 2021, Scott blamed the film's box-office failure on millennials, saying: "I think what it boils down to — what we've got today [are] the audiences who were brought up on these f***ing cell phones. The millennian do not ever want to be taught anything unless you are told it on the cell phone". Ben Affleck, who co-wrote the film with co-lead Matt Damon and Nicole Holofcener, was more measured in his assessment of the film's financial failure:“I've had bad movies that didn't work and I didn't blink. I know why people didn't go–because they weren't good. But I liked what we did. I like what we had to say. I'm really proud of it. So I was really confused. And then to see that it did well on streaming, I thought, 'Well, there you go. That's where the audience is.'”

Critical response 
 The website's critics consensus reads: "The Last Duels critique of systemic misogyny isn't as effective as it might have been, but it remains a well-acted and thought-provoking drama infused with epic grandeur." On Metacritic, the film has a weighted average score of 67 out of 100 based on 50 critics, indicating "generally favorable reviews". Audiences polled by CinemaScore gave the film an average grade of "B+" on an A+ to F scale, while those at PostTrak gave it a 72% positive score.

Owen Gleiberman of Variety considered the film "intriguing but overcooked", writing: "Despite a brief action interlude here or there, The Last Duel turns out to be a lavishly convoluted and, at times, rather interesting medieval soap opera." Reviewing the film for TheWrap, Asher Luberto praised the performances and cinematography while criticizing the screenplay, writing: "Adapting Eric Jager's 2004 non-fiction book with screenwriters Matt Damon, Ben Affleck and Nicole Holofcener, Scott spins a medieval yarn that is by turns gruesome, grotesque, gorgeous and inconsistent." 

Ben Croll of IndieWire, who gave the film a "B+" grade, praised it as "something all too rare on the current Hollywood field of battle: an intelligent and genuinely daring big budget melee that is — above all else — the product of recognizable artistic collaboration." Kyle Smith of National Review wrote that the film was "absolutely soaked in fascinating strangeness", adding: "It works because it doesn’t try to retrofit the facts of the past to fit the assumptions of the present." 

Linda Marric of The Jewish Chronicle gave the film a score of five out of five stars, describing it as "a true return to form for Scott and a brilliant testament to Affleck and Damon's unparalleled screenwriting expertise." Deborah Ross of The Spectator described the film as "bleak, brutal and bloody with little respite – aside from Affleck's Count Pierre, who is nicely bitchy." Kevin Maher of The Times gave the film a score of four out of five, describing it as "a medieval epic that is perhaps [Scott's] most modern movie yet".

Reviewers from NPR's Fresh Air, The Atlantic, The A.V. Club, and CNN all compared The Last Duel to Akira Kurosawa's film Rashomon (1950). Mark Kermode of The Observer gave the film a score of three out of five stars, saying that it "plays like an armour-clad reimagining of Rashomon crossed with a #MeToo-inflected remake of Straw Dogs." He added that the film "has a tendency to mirror its central battle's attempts to address complex issues with the blunt tool of rabble-rousing spectacle." 

Charlotte O'Sullivan of the Evening Standard gave the film three out of five stars, describing it as "a handsome, well-researched drama that's by turns earnest, amusing and unintentionally funny." Joe Morgenstern of The Wall Street Journal praised the film's production values, performances and primary theme, but wrote: "the narrative is cluttered with court intrigue against a background of repetitive battles, and the storytelling structure is exhausting." Brian Lowry of CNN wrote that the film "is muddy, bloody and grim but too drawn out in filtering 14th-century feudal norms through a modern prism." David Fear of Rolling Stone said that the film "ends up perching so close to parody at times that you'd swear the full title was Monty Python's The Last Duel."

Accolades

References

External links
 

2020s American films
2020s English-language films
2020s historical drama films
20th Century Studios films
American action drama films
American historical drama films
American rape and revenge films
British action drama films
British historical drama films
British rape and revenge films
Films impacted by the COVID-19 pandemic
Film productions suspended due to the COVID-19 pandemic
Films about duels
Films based on American novels
Films directed by Ridley Scott
Films postponed due to the COVID-19 pandemic
Films scored by Harry Gregson-Williams
Films set in France
Films set in the 14th century
Films shot in County Meath
Films shot in France
Films with screenplays by Ben Affleck
Films with screenplays by Matt Damon
Films with screenplays by Nicole Holofcener
Pearl Street Films films
Scott Free Productions films
TSG Entertainment films
2020s British films
Hundred Years' War films